Albinas is a Lithuanian masculine given name. People bearing the name Albinas include:
Albinas Albertynas (1934–2005), Lithuanian politician
Albinas Elskus (1926–2007), Lithuanian painter
Albinas Januška (born 1960), Lithuanian politician

References

Lithuanian masculine given names